In electronics, when describing a voltage or current step function, rise time is the time taken by a signal to change from a specified low value to a specified high value. These values may be expressed as ratios or, equivalently, as percentages with respect to a given reference value. In analog electronics and digital electronics, these percentages are commonly the 10% and 90% (or equivalently  and ) of the output step height: however, other values are commonly used.

Overview
Rise time is an analog parameter of fundamental importance in high speed electronics, since it is a measure of the ability of a circuit to respond to fast input signals. There have been many efforts to reduce the rise times of circuits, generators, and data measuring and transmission equipment. These reductions tend to stem from research on faster electron devices and from techniques of reduction in stray circuit parameters (mainly capacitances and inductances). For applications outside the realm of high speed electronics, long (compared to the attainable state of the art) rise times are sometimes desirable: examples are the dimming of a light, where a longer rise-time results, amongst other things, in a longer life for the bulb, or in the control of analog signals by digital ones by means of an analog switch, where a longer rise time means lower capacitive feedthrough, and thus lower coupling noise to the controlled analog signal lines.

Factors affecting rise time
For a given system output, its rise time depend both on the rise time of input signal and on the characteristics of the system.

For example, rise time values in a resistive circuit are primarily due to stray capacitance and inductance. Since every circuit has not only resistance, but also capacitance and inductance, a delay in voltage and/or current at the load is apparent until the steady state is reached.

Alternative definitions
Other definitions of rise time, apart from the one given by the Federal Standard 1037C (1997, p. For example, the time interval graphically corresponding to the intercept points of the tangent drawn through the 50% point of the step function response is occasionally used. Considering a step response , he redefines the delay time  as the first moment of its first derivative , i.e.

Finally, he defines the rise time  by using the second moment

Rise time of model systems

Notation
All notations and assumptions required for the analysis are listed here.

Following , we define  as the percentage low value and  the percentage high value respect to a reference value of the signal whose rise time is to be estimated.
 is the rise time of the analysed system, measured in seconds. By definition, 
 is the lower cutoff frequency (-3 dB point) of the analysed system, measured in hertz.
 is higher cutoff frequency (-3 dB point) of the analysed system, measured in hertz.
 is the impulse response of the analysed system in the time domain.
 is the frequency response of the analysed system in the frequency domain.
For the sake of simplicity, all systems analysed in the "Simple examples of calculation of rise time" section are unity gain electrical networks, and all signals are thought as voltages: the input is a step function of  volts, and this implies that 

Simple examples of calculation of rise time 
The aim of this section is the calculation of rise time of step response for some simple systems:

Gaussian response system 
A system is said to have a Gaussian response if it is characterized by the following frequency response

where  is a constant, related to the high cutoff frequency by the following relation:

Even if this kind frequency response is not realizable by a causal filter, its usefulness lies in the fact that behaviour of a cascade connection of first order low pass filters approaches the behaviour of this system more closely as the number of cascaded stages asymptotically rises to infinity. The corresponding impulse response can be calculated using the inverse Fourier transform of the shown frequency response

Applying directly the definition of step response,

To determine the 10% to 90% rise time of the system it is necessary to solve for time the two following equations:

By using known properties of the error function, the value  is found: since ,

and finally

One-stage low-pass RC network
For a simple one-stage low-pass RC network, the 10% to 90% rise time is proportional to the network time constant :

The proportionality constant can be derived from the knowledge of the step response of the network to a unit step function input signal of  amplitude:

Solving for time

and finally,

The rise time is therefore proportional to the time constant:

Now, noting that

then

and since the high frequency cutoff is equal to the bandwidth,

Finally note that, if the 20% to 80% rise time is considered instead,  becomes:

One-stage low-pass LR network

Even for a simple one-stage low-pass RL network, the 10% to 90% rise time is proportional to the network time constant . The formal proof of this assertion proceed exactly as shown in the previous section: the only difference between the final expressions for the rise time is due to the difference in the expressions for the time constant  of the two different circuits, leading in the present case to the following result

Rise time of damped second order systems 

The quadratic approximation for normalized rise time for a 2nd-order system, step response, no zeros is:

Rise time of cascaded blocks 

Afterwards, its output signal has a rise time  equal to

See also 
Fall time
Frequency response
Impulse response
Step response
Settling time

Notes

References 

.
. 
.
.
.
.
.
.
.
.
.
. 

Control theory
Control engineering
Computational mathematics
Transient response characteristics